Kerdelan (also Romanized as Kerdelān; also known as Kardilu, Kerdīleh, Kordevān, and Kordlan) is a village in Shonbeh Rural District, Shonbeh and Tasuj District, Dashti County, Bushehr Province, Iran. At the 2006 census, its population was 356, in 72 families.

References 

Populated places in Dashti County